Santa Maria degli Angeli (St. Mary of the Angels) is the former church of a now-defunct monastery of that name in Florence, Italy. It belonged to the Camaldolese congregation, which was a reformed branch of the Benedictines. The congregation is based on the hermitage which was founded in 1012 by the hermit St. Romuald at Camaldoli, near Arezzo, hence the name. Very little of the medieval building exists today.

The monastery was a major center of studies in the early Renaissance and its scriptorium was a noted producer of manuscripts of high quality. Many of the illustrations from its work are found in museum collections around the world. The late High Gothic painter, Lorenzo Monaco, was a monk here for a time, while he tested his vocation, but ultimately he left. Nevertheless, he executed a series of artworks for this monastery and  other Camaldolese institutions, both during his time in the Order and afterwards.

The so-called Rotonda degli Scolari, partially built by Filippo Brunelleschi, is part of the complex. The church once housed a series of artworks now located elsewhere, such as the Coronation of the Virgin by Lorenzo Monaco.

The Rotunda
In 1434, Filippo Brunelleschi was commissioned by the Medici family to design an oratory for the monastery. It was located at the corner of the property, along the outer wall. Though construction was rapid, it was halted due to funding problems in 1437. In 1503, the shell was given a simple wooden roof, but the structure deteriorated rapidly. The building, which was used for various purposes, was patched up and given its modern appearance in the 1930s. It was given to the university and thus its more modern name Rotonda degli Scolari ("Scholars' Rotunda").

Copies of original plans and descriptions give us a good indication of Brunelleschi’s intentions. The building was to have an octagonal, domed space at its core, surrounded by eight ancillary spaces. Though the outside - as it was restored - has little similarity with what Brunelleschi intended, on the inside one can see how some of the original spaces were arranged.

References

Florence, St Mary
Camaldolese monasteries in Italy
Filippo Brunelleschi church buildings
Monasteries in Tuscany
Maria Angeli